Ethmia virilisca is a moth in the family Depressariidae. It is found in the Australian state of Western Australia.

References

Moths described in 1985
virilisca